Hearts Up is a 1921 American Silent Western film directed by Val Paul and starring Harry Carey.

Plot
As summarized in a film publication, Jim Drew (Millett), who is a squaw man (a disparaging term for a white man with an Indian wife), receives word that his wife whom he had long deserted had died and that his daughter was coming by train to live with him. Jim is injured when his cabin catches fire, and dies just as David Brent (Carey) arrives to repay a debt of gratitude. Reading the girl's letter stating that she will meet her father in San Francisco, David decides to meet the girl and tell her of her father's death. But when Lorelei (Golden) arrives, she mistakes David for her father and is so happy with her beautiful home that David cannot bring himself to tell her the truth. She met Gordon Swayne (Braidwood), a surveyor, on the train and retains his friendship, which makes David unhappy. When Gordon discovers that David is not Lorelei's father, he threatens him. When Lorelei learns the truth, David decides to go away and leave the girl as mistress of the cabin. Lorelei stops him and tells him she loves him only.

Cast
 Harry Carey as David Brent
 Arthur Millett as Jim Drew
 Charles Le Moyne as Bob Harding
 Frank Braidwood as Gordon Swayne
 Mignonne Golden as Lorelei Drew

Critical reception
While a review found the film pleasing, it noted the age difference between the older Carey and his love interest Golden, who was 16 years old during filming.

See also
 Harry Carey filmography

References

External links

 
 

1921 films
1921 Western (genre) films
American black-and-white films
Films directed by Val Paul
Silent American Western (genre) films
Universal Pictures films
1920s American films
1920s English-language films